Browns Store may refer to:

Browns Store, Ohio
Browns Store, Virginia

See also
Brown-Graves House and Brown's Store
Brown's Department Store